Splendrillia zeobliqua is a species of sea snail, a marine gastropod mollusk in the family Drilliidae.

This extant species is also described as a fossil from the Late Pliocene off Kaikōura Peninsula, New Zealand

Description
The length of the shell attains 18 mm, its diameter 8.5 mm.

Distribution
This marine species is endemic to New Zealand and occurs off South Island. Pegasus Canyon, North Canterbury

References

 Beu, A.G. 1979: Bathyal Nukumaruan mollusca from Oaro, southern Marlborough, New Zealand, New Zealand Journal of Geology and Geophysics, 22(1)

External links
   Spencer H.G., Willan R.C., Marshall B.A. & Murray T.J. (2011). Checklist of the Recent Mollusca Recorded from the New Zealand Exclusive Economic Zone

zeobliqua
Gastropods of New Zealand
Gastropods described in 1979